Vai Anitta (English: Go Anitta) is a biographical docu-series produced by Shots Studios and released on Netflix.

Synopsis
The six-episode first season follows Brazilian artist Anitta as she steps into the international spotlight, going behind-the-scenes at performances, studio sessions, and video shoots all over the world. In addition to giving an up-close view of Anitta, the artist, the series also provides an intimate look at Anitta as a then-24-year-old balancing the stress of stardom, the entertainment industry, and a personal life.

Production and release
Variety announced the series in July 2018 and it aired, on Netflix, on November 16, 2018, days after Anitta released her EP Solo.

Initially a second season of the series was confirmed. However, in October 2020, Netflix announced the launch of the series Anitta: Made in Honorio in place of a second season.

See also
 List of original programs distributed by Netflix

References

External links
 
 

2018 American television series debuts
2018 American television series endings
2018 Brazilian television series debuts
2018 Brazilian television series endings
2010s American documentary television series
2010s Brazilian documentary television series
Brazilian documentary television series
English-language television shows
Portuguese-language Netflix original programming